The Western Canadian Baseball League (WCBL) is a collegiate summer baseball league based in Saskatchewan and Alberta that descends from leagues dating to 1931.

History
The league can trace its roots back to 1931, via its predecessors. The Southern Baseball League existed from 1931 to 1974. The Northern Saskatchewan Baseball League existed from 1959 to 1974. The Saskatchewan Major Baseball League (SMBL) was formed in 1975 as a combination of the two predecessors. Three teams from each former league entered the new loop — the Eston Ramblers, Saskatoon Royals, and Unity Cardinals from the north and Moose Jaw Devons, Regina Red Sox, and Swift Current Indians from the south. 

The league was renamed the Western Major Baseball League in 2000 to reflect more teams playing in Alberta, as well as future expansion to British Columbia. In June 2018 it was announced that the league would be renamed to the Western Canadian Baseball League in 2019.

The 2020 season was canceled due to the COVID-19 pandemic. Due to COVID-19 restrictions and logistics, the 2021 season was played with only five Alberta-based teams and Canadian players only.

Member teams
, WCBL membership consists of 11 teams in two divisions. The top four teams in each division qualify for the post-season.

The Edmonton Prospects will not participate in the 2023 season due to construction delays at Myshak Metro Ballpark.

Former teams
Former teams include the Melville Millionaires (2021), Yorkton Cardinals (2021), Saskatoon Yellow Jackets (2014), Sherwood Park Dukes (2008), St. Albert Prospects (2007), Red Deer Generals (2005), Moose Jaw Devons, Oyen Pronghorns, Kindersley Royals, Eston Ramblers (1993), Saskatoon Liners, Saskatoon Nationals, Hazlet Elks (1993), and Unity Cardinals.

Expansion
Cranbrook, British Columbia, was granted a conditional expansion team in 2011 and was to begin play after building a new stadium. As of 2018, these plans appear to have stalled.

Sylvan Lake was working towards a WCBL team in September 2019.  Under the concept, a 2,200-seat ballpark would be built as part of Sylvan Lake's Pogadl Park development and house a WCBL expansion team backed by the ownership group Hard 4 Sports and Entertainment. The earliest that the ballpark would be completed is 2021, with the WCBL squad potentially beginning play that season as part of a 25-year lease agreement. Plans for a 2021 launch were officially announced November 1, 2019. Branding as the Sylvan Lake Gulls was announced in March 2020.

Spruce Grove is constructing a ballpark.  In May 2020, the Edmonton Prospects confirmed that the team would be leaving Edmonton for Spruce Grove by 2022, but due to construction delays Myshak Metro Ballpark is  scheduled to open no earlier than 2024.

Harry Hallis Memorial Trophy

Saskatchewan Territorial (1895–1905) and Provincial (1906–present) champions have been decided by an annual tournament. In 1967 the first major division was added to the tournament, and the award was named in memory of Harry Hallis. From 1967 until 1974 the name of this provincial champion was added to the trophy. In 1975 when the Saskatchewan Major Baseball League was formed, this trophy continued to be awarded to the SMBL champions, and now the WCBL champions.

League champions

Western Canadian Baseball League (WCBL) Champions: (Harry Hallis Memorial Trophy)
 2022: Okotoks Dawgs
 2021: Lethbridge Bulls
 2020: Season cancelled due to COVID-19 pandemic.
 2019: Okotoks Dawgs

Western Major Baseball League (WMBL) Champions: (Harry Hallis Memorial Trophy)
 2018: Medicine Hat Mavericks
 2017: Swift Current 57's
 2016: Swift Current Indians
 2015: Lethbridge Bulls
 2014: Medicine Hat Mavericks
 2013: Melville Millionaires
 2012: Regina Red Sox
 2011: Regina Red Sox
 2010: Swift Current Indians
 2009: Okotoks Dawgs
 2008: Okotoks Dawgs
 2007: Okotoks Dawgs
 2006: Swift Current Indians
 2005: Swift Current Indians
 2004: Calgary Dawgs
 2003: Medicine Hat Mavericks
 2002: Moose Jaw Miller Express
 2001: Swift Current Indians

Saskatchewan Major Baseball League (SMBL) Champions:

 2000: Swift Current Indians
 1999: Moose Jaw Miller Express
 1998: Swift Current Indians
 1997: Swift Current Indians
 1996: Swift Current Indians
 1995: Oyen Pronghorns
 1994: Swift Current Indians
 1993: Eston Ramblers
 1992: Swift Current Indians
 1991: Kindersley Royals
 1990: Kindersley Royals
 1989: Hazlet Elks
 1988: Hazlet Elks
 1987: Hazlet Elks
 1986: Eston Ramblers
 1985: Kindersley Royals
 1984: Kindersley Royals
 1983: Eston Ramblers
 1982: Eston Ramblers
 1981: Saskatoon Patrick-Liners
 1980: Saskatoon Patrick-Liners
 1979: Saskatoon Patrick-Liners
 1978: Eston Ramblers
 1977: Regina Red Sox
 1976: Regina Red Sox
 1975: Eston Ramblers

Northern Saskatchewan Baseball League Champions:

 1974: Saskatoon Royals
 1973: Saskatoon Commodores
 1972: North Battleford Beavers
 1971: North Battleford Beavers
 1970: Unity Cardinals
 1969: North Battleford Beavers
 1968: North Battleford Beavers
 1967: Unity Cardinals
 1966: Unity Cardinals
 1965: North Battleford Beavers
 1964: North Battleford Beavers
 1963: North Battleford Beavers
 1962: North Battleford Beavers
 1961: Neilburg Monarchs
 1960: Kindersley Klippers
 1959: Spruce Home

The Southern Baseball League (SBL) Champions: (J.T.M. Anderson Trophy)

 1974: Moose Jaw Devons
 1973: Moose Jaw Devons
 1972: Swift Current Indians
 1971: Moose Jaw Regals
 1970: Moose Jaw Regals
 1969: Regina Red Sox
 1968: Moose Jaw Regals
 1967: Yorkton Cardinals
 1966: Moose Jaw Regals
 1965: Swift Current Indians
 1964: Regina Red Sox
 1963: Swift Current Indians
 1962: Moose Jaw Steelers
 1961: Moose Jaw Steelers
 1960: Regina Red Sox
 1959: Swift Current Indians 
 1958: Southey Red Sox
 1957: Southey Red Sox
 1956: Estevan Maple Leafs
 1955: Regina Red Sox
 1954: Moose Jaw Lakers
 1953: Regina Red Sox
 1952: Regina Royal Caps
 1951: Weyburn Beavers
 1950: Estevan Maple Leafs
 1949: Moose Jaw Canucks
 1948: Weyburn Beavers
 1947: Weyburn Beavers
 1946: Regina Clippers
 1945: Weyburn Beavers
 1944: Regina Royal Caps
 1943: (No champion—World War II)
 1942: Regina Red Sox
 1941: Weyburn Beavers
 1940: Weyburn Beavers
 1939: (No champion—World War II)
 1938: Broadview Buffalos
 1937: Weyburn Beavers
 1936: Regina Nationals
 1935: Regina Nationals
 1934: Regina Nationals
 1933: Regina Nationals
 1932: Regina Nationals
 1931: Moose Jaw Canucks

References

External links
 

Summer baseball leagues
Sport in Western Canada
Baseball leagues in Canada
1931 establishments in Canada
Sports leagues established in 1931
Organizations based in Alberta
Sport in Lethbridge